Kartikeya Sharma (born 14 May 1981) is a Rajya Sabha MP and media baron from Haryana where he won defeating the congress heavy weight Ajay Maken in a high decibel election on 10 June 2022. Kartikeya is the founder ITV Media Network which has many news channels including National, English, Hindi & 7 regional channels along with print newspapers including the Sunday Guardian newspaper Daily Guardian and Aaj Samaj .

Personal life 
Sharma was born to politician Venod Sharma and Shakti Rani Sharma on 14 May 1981. He is married to author and professor Aishwarya Sharma (daughter of Indian National Congress politician Kuldeep Sharma, former speaker of Haryana Legislative Assembly) since 2011.

Political career 
Kartikeya Sharma is elected to Rajya Sabha        in 2022 Rajya Sabha elections.  Kartikeya Sharma was the member of a parliamentary delegation led by Deputy Chairman, Rajya Sabha Sh. Harivansh Ji to participate in the 145th assembly of the Interparliamentary Union (IPU) held at Kigali, the capital of Rwanda from 11-15 October, 2022.Almost after two decades India also assumed chair of Executive Committee of Inter-Parliamentary Union of 178 nations at 145th IPU in Kigali. It was a historic win for India. He has recently been honoured with Person Of The Year Award. He recently attended the Shri Parshuram Mahakumbh organised in Karnal.

Career 
Kartikeya Sharma finished his Bachelors in Business Administration From Kings College London. In 2007, Sharma launched ITV Media. He also launched a network of regional TV channels through India News; as of 2015 India News operated five regional channels broadcasting across Haryana, Rajasthan, Madhya Pradesh and Chhattisgarh, Uttar Pradesh, Uttarakhand, Bihar and Jharkhand.
 
Later on, Sharma acquired, through ITV Media, English language news channel NewsX. He entered the print media with the acquisition of The Sunday Guardian, an English language Sunday newspaper, and Aaj Samaj, a Hindi language daily newspaper. He has also been involved with News Wire Services, an Indian TV news wire service.
 
Kartikeya Sharma is the Owner of Picaadily Hotels, Which Along With Hyatt owns a Range of Properties in Delhi and Parts of Haryana and Punjab. In 2015, Sharma set up Pro Sportify with Ashish Chadha, CEO of the Sporty Solutionz, a company that runs the Pro Wrestling League.

Awards
Kartikeya Sharma got the Champions of Change Award 2022. He also won the award for the Best CEO of the Year at the 2016 eNBA Awards.

References

External links
Kartikeya Sharma's linkedin profile

Indian business executives
Alumni of the University of Oxford
Living people
1981 births
Alumni of King's College London
Rajya Sabha members from Haryana